Chiropractic Economics is an American magazine published 20 times a year in Ponte Vedra Beach, Florida. The magazine provides news and information for practicing chiropractors, with a focus on office management, patient relations, personal development, financial planning, legal, clinical and research data, and wellness/nutrition.

Overview 
The first issue of Chiropractic Economics was published in 1954 as the Digest of Chiropractic Economics by William L. Luckey and Helen C. Luckey.

The magazine conducts two surveys on a yearly basis; the Annual Salary and Expense Survey and the Annual Fees and Reimbursements Survey have been used by the United States Department of Labor to compile wage statistics.

Chiropractic Economics started a website in 1996, billing itself as the "Online Chiropractic Community". The site now features chiropractic news, videos, blogs, book reviews, a job board, and current and past magazine content.

According to the 2015 BPA Worldwide audit of Chiropractic Economics subscriber list, total qualified circulation is 29,174 subscriptions.

References

External links
 

1954 establishments in Florida
Business magazines published in the United States
Chiropractic
English-language magazines
Magazines established in 1954
Magazines published in Florida
Professional and trade magazines